Lucky Loser is a 1934 British comedy film directed by Reginald Denham and starring Richard Dolman, Aileen Marson and Anna Lee. It was made as a quota quickie at British and Dominion's Elstree Studios for release by the British subsidiary of Paramount Pictures.

Cast
 Richard Dolman as Tom O'Grady  
 Aileen Marson Kathleen Willoughby  
 Anna Lee as Ursula Hamilton  
 Annie Esmond as Mrs. Hamilton  
 Roland Culver as Pat Hayden  
 Noel Shannon as Peters 
 Joan White as Alice 
 Gordon McLeod as Auctioneer
 Mary Gaskell 
 Alice Lane

References

Bibliography
 Low, Rachael. Filmmaking in 1930s Britain. George Allen & Unwin, 1985.
 Wood, Linda. British Films, 1927-1939. British Film Institute, 1986.

External links

1934 films
British comedy films
1934 comedy films
Films directed by Reginald Denham
Quota quickies
British black-and-white films
British and Dominions Studios films
Films shot at Imperial Studios, Elstree
1930s English-language films
1930s British films